Vera Grigoryevna Djatel (also transliterated Dyatel; born 3 March 1984) is a Ukrainian international football midfielder who most recently played for Sporting de Huelva. She previously played for Swedish Damallsvenskan club Linköpings FC, Lehenda Chernihiv and Zhytlobud Kharkiv in the Ukrainian League, as well as Zvezda Perm and Zorky Krasnogorsk in the Russian Championship.

Club career

Djatel helped Zvezda reach the 2009 UEFA Women's Cup Final with three goals in the quarter-final and semi-final ties against Brøndby and Umeå. She won two Russian leagues and three Ukrainian leagues with Zvezda and Zhytlobud respectively.

In January 2015 Djatel joined Linköpings FC of Sweden, who had been trying to sign her for several years. She suffered an injury in August 2015 and left Linköpings in July 2016 after failing to reclaim her place in the team.

She moved to Spanish Primera División club Sporting de Huelva for the 2016–17 season, but agreed to terminate her contract in December 2016 after suffering from tendinitis in her knees.

International career

Djatel debuted for Ukraine against England in November 2000 and later represented her country at UEFA Women's Euro 2009. A starter in all three games, she assisted Daryna Apanaschenko for Ukraine's first goal in the tournament against Denmark.

Official international goals
 2005 European Championship qualification
 1 in Ukraine 1–0 Scotland
 2009 European Championship qualification
 1 in Slovakia 0–4 Ukraine
 1 in Ukraine 2–0 Slovenia (play-offs)
 2011 World Cup qualification
 1 in Ukraine 7–0 Bosnia and Herzegovina
 1 in Bosnia 0–5 Ukraine
 2013 European Championship qualification
 2 in Estonia 1–4 Ukraine
 1 in Slovakia 0–2 Ukraine
 1 in Belarus 0–5 Ukraine

Honours
Lehenda Chernihiv
 Ukrainian Women's League (3) 2000, 2001, 2002
 Women's Cup (2) 2001, 2002

Zvezda Perm
Russian Leagues (2) 2008, 2009
Russian Women's Cup (2) 2007, 2012

Linköpings FC
 Damallsvenskan (1) 2016

Zhytlobud-2 Kharkiv
 Ukrainian Women's League (2) 2017–18, 2018–19, 2019–20

References

External links

 
 
 
 Vira Diatel at Sporting de Huelva 
 

1984 births
Living people
Footballers from Chernihiv
Ukrainian women's footballers
WFC Lehenda-ShVSM Chernihiv players
WFC Zhytlobud-1 Kharkiv players
WFC Zhytlobud-2 Kharkiv players
Expatriate women's footballers in Russia
Ukrainian expatriate sportspeople in Russia
Linköpings FC players
Damallsvenskan players
Ukrainian expatriate footballers
Ukrainian expatriate sportspeople in Sweden
Expatriate women's footballers in Sweden
Zvezda 2005 Perm players
FC Zorky Krasnogorsk (women) players
Ukraine women's international footballers
Women's association football midfielders
Sporting de Huelva players
Ukrainian expatriate sportspeople in Spain
Expatriate women's footballers in Spain
Primera División (women) players
Ukrainian expatriate sportspeople in Azerbaijan